Kilmeade may refer to:

 Kilmead, a village in County Kildare, Ireland, officially named Kilmeade
 Brian Kilmeade, American presenter/commentator on Fox News